Thurston Island is an ice-covered, glacially dissected island,  long,  wide and  in area, lying a short way off the northwest end of Ellsworth Land, Antarctica. It is the third-largest island of Antarctica, after Alexander Island and Berkner Island.

The island was discovered from the air by Rear Admiral Byrd on February 27, 1940, who named it for W. Harris Thurston, a New York textile manufacturer, designer of the windproof "Byrd Cloth" and sponsor of Antarctic expeditions. Thurston Island is separated from the mainland by Peacock Sound, which is occupied by the western portion of Abbot Ice Shelf. It divides Bellingshausen Sea to the east from Amundsen Sea to the west.

Originally mistaken as a peninsula, the feature was not recognised an island until 1960.

Geography 
The western extremity of the island is Cape Flying Fish. The eastern extremity is Cape Annawan, off Tierney Peninsula. The southeast end of the island is Cape Walker.

The island is divided south-north by the Walker Mountains, a range of peaks and nunataks. Several other peaks are situated on the Edwards and Noville Peninsulas. There are many glaciers on Thurston Island.

Features by coast

North coast 
The north coast of the island is indented by a series of alternating inlets and peninsulas. Cape Petersen forms the westernmost portion of the northern coast. East of that is Jones Peninsula, then Dyer Point and Hughes Peninsula. Henry Inlet indents the coast to the east, and Tinglof Peninsula forms its eastern shore. Wagoner Inlet is east of that, followed by Starr Peninsula. Glacier Bight is to the east, and just north off the coast from them are the hazardous Porters Pinnacles. East of Starr Peninsula are Potaka Inlet, Kearns Peninsula, followed by Peale Inlet. The larger Noville Peninsula is to the east. It is bordered by Murphy Inlet, whose southern end is split into two prongs by Linsley Peninsula and Ball Peninsula. Edwards Peninsula, Koether Inlet, and the larger Evans Peninsula are to the east. Cadwalader Inlet, Lofgren Peninsula, and Morgan Inlet form the northeastern coast.

East coast 

The easternmost point of the island is Tierney Peninsula, southeast of which is Seraph Bay. Simpson Bluff, a broad ice-covered bluff, sits between Levko Glacier and Savage Glacier where they enter the bay. Nearby Baker Knob is a small rounded coastal elevation which has an abrupt east face. Both Simpson Bluff and Baker Knob were named by the Advisory Committee on Antarctic Names (US-ACAN) for personnel from the Eastern Group of U.S. Navy Operation HIGHJUMP: Photographer's Mates R.M. Simpson and T.W. Baker, respectively. Operation HIGHJUMP obtained aerial photographs of Thurston Island and adjacent coastal areas in 1946-47.

It was discovered on helicopter flights from the USS Burton Island (AGB-1) and USS Glacier (AGB-4) during the U.S. Navy Bellingshausen Sea Expedition in February 1960, and was named by US-ACAN for Henry T. Harrison Jr., a U.S. Weather Bureau meteorologist with the Byrd Antarctic Expedition in 1928–30.

The southeast point of the island is Cape Walker.

South coast 
On the south side of the island are King Peninsula, Williamson Peninsula, Evans Point, and Von der Wall Point, projecting into Peacock Sound. Williamson Peninsula is bordered by Schwartz Cove and O'Dowd Cove.

It was mapped by the United States Geological Survey (USGS) from surveys and U.S. Navy air photos, 1960–66, and named by US-ACAN for John A. Shelton meteorologist at Byrd Station, 1963-64.

The descriptive name was given by the Advisory Committee on Antarctic Names (US-ACAN); small dispersed nunataks rise above the ice surface, giving the feature a prickly appearance. Belknap Nunatak, an ice-covered spur, is the largest outcrop on the ridge. It was mapped by the USGS from surveys and from U.S. Navy air photos, 1960–66, and named by US-ACAN for William Belknap, a field assistant at Byrd Station, 1964–65.

See also 
Composite Antarctic Gazetteer
 List of Antarctic and sub-Antarctic islands
 List of Antarctic islands south of 60° S
 Scientific Committee on Antarctic Research
 Territorial claims in Antarctica

Further reading 
 International Symposium on Antarctic Earth Sciences 5th : 1987, Geological Evolution of Antarctica, Cambridge, England, P 401
 A.M. GRUNO, D. V. Kent, I. W. D. Dalzeil, New Paleomagnetic Data From Thurston Island' Implications for the Tectonics of West Antarctica and Weddell Sea Opening, JOURNAL OF GEOPHYSICAL RESEARCH, VOL. 96, NO. Bll, PAGES 17,935-17,954, OCTOBER 10, 1991

References

 
Islands of Ellsworth Land